Fenix Toulouse Handball is a French handball team based in Toulouse, that plays in the LNH Division 1.

Crest, colours, supporters

Naming history

Kit manufacturers

Kits

Sports Hall information

Name: – Palais des sports André-Brouat
City: – Toulouse
Capacity: – 4397
Address: – 3 Rue Pierre Laplace, 31000 Toulouse, France

Results
Coupe de France:
Winners: 1998 
Finalists: 1999
Coupe de la Ligue:
Finalists: 2015

Team

Current squad 

Squad for the 2022–23 season

Technical staff
 Head coach:  Danijel Anđelković
 Assistant coach:  Rémi Calvel
 Fitness coach:  Maxime Altenhoven
 Physiotherapist:  Hervé Fournier
 Club doctor:  Pierre Sébastien

Transfers

Transfers for the 2023–24 season

Joining  
  Vojin Čabrilo (LB) (from  RK Crvenka)
  Casper Käll (CB) (from  Lugi HF)
  Gabriel Nyembo (P) (from  Dunkerque Handball Grand Littoral) 

Leaving 
  Erik Balenciaga (CB) (to  MT Melsungen) 
  Tobias Wagner (P) (to  Bregenz Handball)

Previous squads

Former club members

Notable former players

  Rémi Calvel (2010–2017)
  Robin Cantegrel (2021–)
  Philippe Debureau (1984–1986)
  Cyril Dumoulin (2014–2016)
  Rock Feliho (2012)
  Jérôme Fernandez (1997–1999, 2011–2015)
  Daouda Karaboué (2010–2013)
  Christophe Kempé (1996–1999, 2001–2010)
  Bruno Martini (1997–1998)
  Aymeric Minne (2013–2015)
  Claude Onesta (1968–1987)
  Wesley Pardin (2006–2017)
  Frédéric Perez (1994–1997)
  Stéphane Plantin (1994–2006)
  Yohann Ploquin (1998–2008)
  Valentin Porte (2008–2016)
  Seufyann Sayad (2004–2006)
  Cédric Sorhaindo (2010)
  Ayoub Abdi (2019–)
  Abdelkrim Bendjemil (1992–1998)
  Rabah Soudani (2005–2009)
  Tobias Wagner (2021–)
  Jef Lettens (2019–)
  Vitali Feshchanka (1999–2000)
  César Almeida (2019–2021)
  Erwin Feuchtmann (2021–)
  Luka Sokolić (2020–)
  Michal Brůna (2002–2003)
  Petr Linhart (2016–2017)
  Kasper Kisum (2017–2018)
  Damien Kabengele (2010–2013)
  Alexandros Vasilakis (2013)
  Yassine Idrissi (2016–2019)
  Goce Georgievski (2015–2016)
  Vladimir Osmajić (2013–2016)
  Vasko Ševaljević (2015–2017)
  Luc Steins (2019–2020)
  Alexander Buchmann (2007)
  Henrik Jakobsen (2018–2021)
  Rafał Przybylski (2017–2019)
  Rudi Prisăcaru (1995–2002)
  Miha Žvižej (2012–2016)
  Arnau García (2017–2020)
  Ángel Montoro (2013–2014)
  Gonzalo Pérez de Vargas (2013–2014)
  Salvador Puig (2011–2014)
  Álvaro Ruiz Sánchez (2015–2019)
  Ferran Solé (2016–2020)
  Danijel Anđelković (2010–2016)
  Uros Borzas (2020–2022)
  Nemanja Ilić (2013–)
  Milan Jovanović (2018–)
  Vladica Stojanović (2010)
  Andreas Cederholm (2016–2017)
  Fredric Pettersson (2016–2018, 2021–)
  Anouar Ayed (2004–2013)
  Marouen Belhadj (2009–2011)

Former coaches

References

External links

Fenix Toulouse
Sport in Toulouse